Provider may refer to:

 supplier
 Health care provider, an individual or institution that provides health care services
 Internet service provider,  a business or organization that offers access to the Internet and related services
 Provider model, a design pattern originally developed by Microsoft for use in the .NET framework
 A euphemism for prostitute, most often referring to high-end sex workers who do not display their profession to the general public
 C-123 Provider, an American military transport aircraft
 "Provider" (Angel), a 2002 episode of the television series Angel
 "Provider", a song by Days of the New from their 1999 album Days of a New
 "Provider" (N.E.R.D. song), 2001
 "Provider", a song by IQ from their 1997 concept album Subterranea
 Providers, a Danish music production duo made up of Jeppe Federspiel and Rasmus Stabell
 "Provider" (Frank Ocean song), 2017